Dissonomini is a tribe of darkling beetles in the family Tenebrionidae. There are at least two genera in Dissonomini, found in the Palearctic.

Genera
These genera belong to the tribe Dissonomini:
 Bradyus Dejean, 1834
 Dissonomus Jacquelin du Val, 1861

References

Further reading

 
 

Tenebrionoidea